1979 United Kingdom budget may refer to:

 April 1979 United Kingdom budget
 June 1979 United Kingdom budget